Wallace Fox (March 9, 1895 – June 30, 1958) was an American film director. He directed more than 80 films between 1927 and 1953. He was born in Purcell, Oklahoma, and died in Hollywood, California.

Selected filmography

 Trail of Courage (1928)
 The Ridin' Renegade (1928)
 The Avenging Rider (1928)
 Driftin' Sands (1928)
 Partners of the Trail (1931)
 Devil on Deck (1932)
 Cannonball Express (1932)
 Bowery Blitzkrieg (1941)
 The Corpse Vanishes (1942)
 Let's Get Tough! (1942)
 Bowery at Midnight (1942)
 'Neath Brooklyn Bridge (1942)
 Bullets for Bandits (1942)
 The Girl from Monterrey (1943)
 The Great Mike (1944)
 Brenda Starr, Reporter (1945)
 Docks of New York (1945)
 Pillow of Death (1945)
 The Vigilante (1947)
 The Gay Amigo (1949)
 West of Wyoming (1950)
 Gunslingers (1950)
 Blazing Bullets (1951)

References

External links

1895 births
1958 deaths
People from Purcell, Oklahoma
Film directors from Oklahoma